Tor Bremer (born 9 February 1955) is a farmer and politician from Luster, Norway in Sogn og Fjordane municipality. He was deputy mayor of the municipality from 2003-2007 for the Arbeiderpartiet. At the 2009 Norwegian parliamentary election, he was the second candidate for Ap in Sogn og Fjordane.

Tor Bremer is from Luster and was leader of Sogn og Fjordane Arbeiderparti for a year.

External links
 TV2 - Presentation of the candidate.

1955 births
Living people
Labour Party (Norway) politicians
21st-century Norwegian politicians
People from Luster, Norway